Yuan Baocheng (born December 1964) is a Chinese politician and the current Mayor of Dongguan.  He was appointed vice mayor and acting mayor in 2011 by the Dongguan Municipal People's Congress.  The same body elected him mayor in 2012.

Yuan earned a master's degree from Southwest University of Political Science & Law. 

Previously Yuan had been Vice Mayor of Shenzhen.

References

Living people
Political office-holders in Guangdong
1964 births